Branksome may refer to:
 Branksome, County Durham, England, a suburb of Darlington
 Branksome, Dorset, England, a suburb of Poole
 Branksome Hall, a private school for girls in Toronto, Ontario, Canada
 Branksome Hall Asia, a private school for girls in Seogwipo, South Korea
 Branksome, a steam boat in the National Historic Fleet

See also
 Branxholm, Tasmania
 Branxholme (disambiguation)